Lorin Dreyfuss (sometimes known as Loryn Dreyfuss) is an American actor, film producer, and screenplay writer, born in New York City on December 4, 1944. He is the older brother of actor Richard Dreyfuss. His daughter is actress Natalie Dreyfuss. His nephew is actor Ben Dreyfuss. His family is Jewish.

Filmography
My Life in Ruins, 2009, billed as Loryn Dreyfuss.
Clerks: The Animated Series, 2000 as Old Jay.
The Angry Beavers, 1998 as Leonard Beaver.
Superman: The Animated Series, voice of Ben Mardon.
Batman: The Animated Series, voice of Salvo Smith.
Let It Ride, 1989 as Grandstand Person.
Moon Over Parador, 1988 as First Dictator.
Dutch Treat, 1987 as Norm.
Detective School Dropouts, 1986 as Paul Miller.

Writer
Dutch Treat, 1987
Detective School Dropouts, 1986
Reggie (TV series), 1983
Skatetown, U.S.A., 1979
Fantasy Island, 1977

Producer
Whatever (TV series), 2000
Skatetown, U.S.A., 1979

References

External links
Lorin Dreyfuss Filmography

Living people
1944 births
American male actors
American film producers
American Ashkenazi Jews
20th-century American Jews
21st-century American Jews